Juva is a Finnish-language surname that may refer to:

 Einar W. Juva (1892–1966), Finnish historian
 Mikko Juva (1918–2004), Finnish Lutheran archbishop
 Siiri Juva (1886–1974), Finnish writer
 Valter Juva (1865–1922), Finnish translator and writer

Finnish-language surnames